The Kanishka Stupa ( Sanskrit :कनिष्क स्तूप ) was a monumental stupa established by the Kushan king Kanishka during the 2nd century CE in today's Shaji-ki-Dheri on the outskirts of Peshawar, Pakistan. 

The stupa was built during the Kushan era to house Buddhist relics, and was among the tallest buildings in the ancient world. The stupa is also famous for its Buddhist relics, which were transferred to the U Khanti Hall at Mandalay Hill, in Mandalay, Burma after their discovery.

History

Background
According to Buddhists the building of the stupa was foretold by the Buddha:
"The Buddha, pointing to a small boy making a mud tope….[said] that on that spot Kanishka would erect a tope by his name." Vinaya sutra 

The same story is repeated in a Khotanese scroll found at Dunhuang, which first described how Kanishka would arrive 400 years after the death of the Buddha. The account also describes how Kanishka came to raise his stupa: 
"A desire thus arose in [Kanishka to build a vast stupa]….at that time the four world-regents learnt the mind of the king. So for his sake they took the form of young boys….[and] began a stupa of mud....the boys said to [Kanishka] ‘We are making the Kanishka-stupa.’….At that time the boys changed their form....[and] said to him, ‘Great king, by you according to the Buddha’s prophecy is a Sangharama to be built wholly (?) with a large stupa and hither relics must be invited which the meritorious good beings...will bring."

First stupa (150 CE)

The original Kushan stone stupa was probably built after the death of Kanishka the Great, between 150 and 300 CE, but probably circa 151 CE, with a shape similar to the contemporary Loriyan Tangai stupas and the addition of schist reliefs.

Second stupa (4th century CE)
The stupa was rebuilt under Kushan rule in the 4th century CE into a cruciform stupa with a tower-like structure, with four staircases and four corner bastions, and possibly pillars at each corner. The stupa's symmetrically cross-shaped plinth measured , though the plinth had large staircases at each of the stupa's sides. In total, the base of the stupa may have spanned  on each side. The plinth was likely decorated with sculpted reliefs, while niches built into the dome's four cardinal points was inlayed with precious stone. The tall wooden superstructure was built atop a decorated stone base, and crowned with a 13-layer copper-gilded chatra.

Reconstruction
The stupa's wooden superstructure was rebuilt atop the stone base, and crowned with a 13-layer copper-gilded chatra. In the 5th century CE, stucco imagery was probably added to the site, in keeping with contemporary popularity for Buddhist imagery.

Destruction
Sung Yun noted in the early 6th century that the tower had been struck by lightning at least three times, having been rebuilt after each strike. The tall stupa with a copper top acted as a lightning rod. This propensity to attract lightning strikes may explain the dearth of any surviving examples of wooden-tower stupas.

In 726 CE, the Korean pilgrim Hyecho visited Gandhara and saw the Kanishka monastery and stupa, of which he said in his Memoir of the pilgrimage to the five kingdoms of India: "The monastery is called Kanishka. There is a great stupa which constantly glows. The monastery and the stupa were built by the former king Kanishka".

Excavations
The stupa was discovered and excavated in 1908–1909 by a British archaeological mission under David Brainard Spooner, and led to the discovery in its base of the Kanishka casket, a six-sided rock crystal reliquary containing three small fragments of bone, relics of the Buddha (which were transferred to Mandalay, Burma) and a dedication in Kharoshthi involving Kanishka.

Contemporary accounts

In 520 CE, Sung Yun describes the stupa in the following terms:
"The king proceeded to widen the foundation of the Great Tower 300 paces and more. To crown all, he placed a roof-pole upright and even. Throughout the building he used ornamental wood, he constructed stairs to lead to the top....there was an iron-pillar, 3-feet high with thirteen gilded circlets. Altogether the height from the ground was 700 feet.”

Legacy
The stupa is believed to have influence later constructions of "tower stupas" throughout ancient Turkistan. The construction of wooden towers topped with metal chatras made such buildings act as lightning rods, which could explain why such towers have all but disappeared.

Current status

The site has not been preserved. The location was re-identified in 2011. It is located outside the Gunj Gate of the old Walled City of Peshawar and is called Akhunabad.

See also
 List of tallest structures built before the 20th century

References

Further reading
 D’Ancona, Mirella Levi. (1949): "Is the Kaniṣka Reliquary a work from Mathurā?" Art Bulletin, Vol. 31, No. 4 (Dec., 1949), pp. 321–323.
 Dobbins, K. Walton. (1971): The Stūpa and Vihāra of Kanishka I. The Asiatic Society of Bengal Monograph Series, Vol. XVIII. Calcutta.
 Dobbins, K. Walton (1968): "Two Gandhāran Reliquaries." East and West, 18, 1968, pp. 151–165.
 Fenet, Annick (2020): « "In other words, authentic relics of the Buddha himself !" La fouille du stūpa de Kanishka à Shāh-jī-kī-Dherī (février-mars 1909) », in S. Alaura (ed.), Digging in the archives. From the history of oriental studies to the history of ideas, Roma (Documenta Asiana XI), 2020, p. 63-90
 Hargreaves, H. (1910–11): "Excavations at Shāh-jī-kī Ḍhērī." Archaeological Survey of India, pp. 25–32.  
 Spooner, D. B. (1908-9): "Excavations at Shāh-ji-Dherī." Archaeological Survey of India, pp. 38–59.

History of Khyber Pakhtunkhwa
Stupas in Pakistan
Buddhism in Pakistan
Kushan Empire
Peshawar
Buddhist sites in Pakistan